The American Association of Anthropological Genetics (AAAG) is an educational and scientific organization founded in 1994. The association aims to promote the study of anthropological genetics and publishes Human Biology as its official scientific journal.

References

External links 

 American Association of Anthropological Genetics

Educational organizations based in the United States
Organizations established in 1994
Anthropology-related professional associations